Structured writing is a form of technical writing that uses and creates structured documents.

The term was coined by Robert E. Horn and became a central part of his information mapping method of analyzing, organizing, and displaying knowledge in print and in the new online presentation of text and graphics.

Horn and colleagues identified dozens of common documentation types, then analyzed them into structural components called information blocks. They identified over 200 common block types. These were assembled into information types using information maps.

The seven most common information types were concept, procedure, process, principle, fact, structure, and classification.

Some of the problems that structured writing addresses 
Structured writing has been developed to address common problems in complex writing:

 Organizing large amounts of material
 Maintaining an orderly structure to provide a consistent experience to users
 Providing users with a more intuitive and obvious experience 
 Ensuring the completeness of documentation
 Targeting content to varying audiences
 Coordinating writing projects among a group of writers
 Organizing each chunk of content in an intuitive way
 Organizing pages of content in a way that helps users understand its place in the whole body of knowledge
 Maximizing the efficiency with which documentation can be understood and used

Relation to DITA 
The seven most common information types identified by Horn and colleagues are loosely related to the three basic information types in Darwin Information Typing Architecture (DITA): concept, task, and reference. An information mapping  is a set of steps for a person. A  is a set of steps for a system. Both resemble the DITA . DITA topics are assembled into documents using DITA maps.

See also 
 Component content management system
 Semantic markup
 
 Topic-based authoring

References

Notes

Technical communication